Smiřice is a town in Hradec Králové District in the Hradec Králové Region of the Czech Republic. It has about 3,000 inhabitants.

Administrative parts
Villages of Rodov and Trotina are administrative parts of Smiřice.

Geography
It lies in an agricultural landscape of the East Elbe Table. The town is situated on the right bank of the Elbe River.

History

The first written mention of Smiřice is from 1361. It was originally a settlement between two branches of the Elbe with a fortress, which was later rebuilt into a castle. Smiřice was the centre of a large estate, owned by various noble families, most notably by the Smiřický of Smiřice (until 1476), by the Trčka of Lípa family (1498–1636), and by the Sternberg family (1685–1780). In 1659, the village was promoted to a town.

Transport
The D11 motorway runs next to the town.

Sights
The landmark of the town is the Smiřice Castle. The fortress, which formerly stood on the site of the castle, was most likely rebuilt in the first third of the 17th century. Artistic modifications were made around 1700 by the Sternbergs. Today the castle is privately owned and is gradually reconstructed.

Twin towns – sister cities

Smiřice is twinned with:
 Boguszów-Gorce, Poland

References

External links

 (in Czech)

Cities and towns in the Czech Republic
Populated places in Hradec Králové District
Populated riverside places in the Czech Republic
Populated places on the Elbe